The Middleton Family at the New York World's Fair is a 1939 American film directed by Robert R. Snody produced by Westinghouse for their exhibit at the 1939 New York World's Fair.

In 2012, the film was added to the National Film Registry, being deemed "culturally, historically, or aesthetically significant."

Cast 
Marjorie Lord as Babs
Jimmy Lydon as Bud
Ruth Lee as Mother
Harry Shannon as Father
Adora Andrews as Grandma
Douglas Stark as Jim Treadway
George J. Lewis as Nicholas Makaroff
Georgette Harvey as Maid

References
Notes

External links 
The Middleton Family at the New York World’s Fair essay  by Andrew F. Wood on the National Film Registry website

1939 films
1939 New York World's Fair
1939 drama films
United States National Film Registry films
American drama films
World's fair films
American black-and-white films
1930s English-language films
1930s American films
Westinghouse Electric Company